Sigurd Tafjord (born 30 January 1997) is a Norwegian football striker who plays for Spjelkavik.

Growing up in Langevåg IL, he made his debut for the senior team before joining Aalesunds FK's youth setup. From here, he was loaned out to Brattvåg IL in 2016 and transferred to Spjelkavik IL in mid-2017. In the autumn of 2020 he returned to Aalesunds FK and made his Eliteserien debut in October 2020 in Kristiansund. In 2021 he returned to Spjelkavik.

References

1997 births
Living people
Sportspeople from Ålesund
Norwegian footballers
Brattvåg IL players
Spjelkavik IL players
Aalesunds FK players
Eliteserien players
Association football forwards